Eunidia naviauxi is a species of beetle in the family Cerambycidae. It was described by Villiers in 1977. It is known from Saudi Arabia, Djibouti, Yemen, Egypt, Chad, Oman, Niger, and Senegal.

References

Eunidiini
Beetles described in 1977